Cuca is a commune in Galați County, Western Moldavia, Romania with a population of 2,560 people. It is composed of a single village, Cuca.

References

Communes in Galați County
Localities in Western Moldavia